Leopold Friedrich Franz Sieghard Hubertus Erdmann, Hereditary Prince of Anhalt (11 April 1938 – 9 October 1963) was the head of the House of Ascania, the family which ruled the Duchy of Anhalt until 1918.

Life
He was born at Ballenstedt Castle, a castle belonging to the ducal family of Anhalt, as the eldest son of Duke Joachim Ernst of Anhalt and his second wife, Editha Marwitz (von Stephani, by adoption).

Prince Friedrich succeeded his father as head of the Ducal House of Anhalt and titular Duke of Anhalt following his death in NKVD special camp number 2 (formerly Buchenwald concentration camp) as a prisoner of the Soviet Union on 18 February 1947. The succession of Prince Friedrich was disputed by his uncle, Prince Eugen, who also claimed the headship of the house after the death of Duke Joachim Ernst.

Prince Friedrich died on 9 October 1963 in Munich, after being involved in a car crash. Following his death, he was succeeded as head of the ducal house by his younger brother, Prince Eduard.

Ancestry

References

External links
House of Anhalt-Askanien

1938 births
1963 deaths
Dukes of Anhalt
Child pretenders
Road incident deaths in Germany
Sons of monarchs